Events in the year 1902 in Belgium.

Incumbents
Monarch: Leopold II
Prime Minister: Paul de Smet de Naeyer

Events
 6 February – Contract signed for the Belgian concession of Tianjin.
 18 April – Clashes in Leuven between the civic guard and demonstrators for universal manhood suffrage leave six workers dead and fourteen injured.
 25 May – Belgian general election, 1902
 15 June – Exposition des primitifs flamands à Bruges opens (to 5 October).
 3 July – Prince Albert and Princess Elisabeth visit Bruges for the Exposition des primitifs flamands à Bruges.
 17–25 August – "Groeninghefeesten": pageants and celebrations to mark the sixth centenary of the Battle of the Golden Spurs in Kortrijk. 
 19 August –  Antoon Stillemans, bishop of Ghent, consecrates the new abbey church of Dendermonde Abbey, built in Gothic Revival style.
 3–7 September – Fourteenth International Eucharistic Congress held in Namur.
 15 November – Italian anarchist Gennaro Rubino fails to assassinate Leopold II.

Publications

Studies and reports
 Annuaire de la Législation du Travail, 1901 (Brussels, Ministère de l'Industrie et du Travail, 1902)

Exhibitions
 William Henry James Weale, Exposition des Primitifs flamands et d'Art ancien (Bruges, Desclée, De Brouwer)

Scholarship
 Paul Fredericq, Corpus documentorum inquisitionis haereticae pravitatis Neerlandicae, vol. 5.
 Henri Pirenne, Histoire de Belgique, vol. 1, revised edition.
 Joseph Van den Gheyn, Catalogue des manuscrits de la Bibliothèque royale de Belgique, vol. 2.

Literature
 Stijn Streuvels, Langs de wegen

Art and architecture 

Buildings
 Gothic Revival Abbey Church in Dendermonde

Births
 21 January – Paul Harsin, historian (died 1983)
 3 March — Hélène Mallebrancke, civil engineer and resister (died 1940)
 19 March – Louisa Ghijs, actress (died 1985)
 11 July – Leo Collard, politician (died 1981)
 21 August – Omer Becu, trade unionist (died 1982)
 10 November – Jean Denis, collaborator (died 1992)

Deaths
23 November – Cornelius Van Leemputten (born 1841), painter

References

 
1900s in Belgium